The 2001–02 season was Sporting Clube de Portugal's 96th season in existence and the club's 68th consecutive season in the top flight of Portuguese football. In addition to the domestic league, Sporting CP participated in this season's editions of the Taça de Portugal and UEFA Cup. The season covers the period from 1 July 2001 to 30 June 2002.

Players

First-team squad

Transfers

In

Out

Pre-season and friendlies

Competitions

Overall record

Primeira Liga

League table

Results summary

Results by round

Matches

Taça de Portugal

UEFA Cup

First round

Second round

Third round

Statistics

Goalscorers

References

External links

Sporting CP seasons
Sporting CP
Portuguese football championship-winning seasons